Shri Nehru Maha Vidyalaya College of Arts & Science is located in the city of Coimbatore, India.

Principal name : Mehlam

History
The Coimbatore Welfare Association, CWA, a voluntary organization committed to the cause of social service with a thrust on education started the Shri Nehru Vidyalaya Matriculation Higher Secondary School (SNVMHSS) in 1964.  On its Silver Jubilee in 1989, the organization started the SNMV College Of Arts & Science (SNMV). CWA serves the cause of education starting from Kindergarten to PG and research level under a single management. It is accredited with "A" grade by NAAC

Location

Courses offered
All the courses are affiliated to Bharathiar University.

b.com pa

Clubs and other activities
 NCC Airwing
 Youth red cross
 Yoga academy

External links
 SNMV Arts and Science College Coimbatore, Commerce College - Shri Nehru Maha Vidyalaya College of Arts and Science, Educational Institution, Coimbatore, Tamilnadu, India

Universities and colleges in Coimbatore
Arts colleges in India
Monuments and memorials to Jawaharlal Nehru
Educational institutions established in 1989
1989 establishments in Tamil Nadu